An affiliated school (also affiliated college, federated school, federated college or federated university) is an educational institution that operates independently, but also has a formal collaborative agreement with another, usually larger institution that may have some level of control or influence over its academic policies, standards or programs.

While a university may have one or several affiliated colleges, it is not necessarily a collegiate university, which is a union or federation of semi-autonomous colleges. For the most part, this model is restricted to colleges and universities. On rarer occasions, however, elementary schools or high schools may also enter into affiliating agreements.

Examples of affiliated schools by area

Canada
In Canada several universities have federated or affiliated colleges, some of which predate the parent institution.

University of Alberta
St. Joseph's College is the Roman Catholic liberal arts college affiliated with the University of Alberta. The college provides offers courses open to students of both institutions, an on-campus chapel for the celebration of mass during the week, and a coeducational residence.

Laurentian University
Laurentian University had four federated institutions, three of which were located on the main campus in Sudbury, which offered a variety of degrees in association with the university. The federations were dissolved as a result of the financial crisis the university experienced on May 1, 2021.
L’Université de Hearst is French language university-level institution located in Hearst and the only formerly federated institution that is not located on the main Sudbury campus. It is now an independent university in its own right.
Thorneloe University is affiliated with the Anglican Church of Canada and offered courses in fine arts, theatre, classics, and women's studies. It currently only offers theological programs, which have been continued post-break up of the federation.
The University of Sudbury was a Catholic, bilingual institution, which offered courses in religious studies, philosophy, indigenous studies and folklore. It is now a French language, secular university, but is not currently accepting students as it restructures.
Huntington University was focused on arts and humanities studies, is affiliated with the United Church, and offered courses in communication studies, ethics, gerontology, philosophy, religious studies and theology. It is currently not offering degree programs, but is instead operating as an independent student residence.

University of Regina
The University of Regina has three federated colleges, which offer various degrees in conjunction with the university:
 Luther College, an Evangelical Lutheran liberal arts college;
 Campion College, a Jesuit Catholic liberal arts college;
 First Nations University of Canada, a college offering curriculum developed in partnership with First Nations communities and social support for First Nations students.

All three colleges are located on the University of Regina's main campus, and all students of the federated colleges are also registered as students of the university.

University of Saskatchewan
St. Thomas More College is the Roman Catholic liberal arts college federated with the University of Saskatchewan, and is located on the university's campus in Saskatoon. The administration and financial details of the college are autonomous, but the academics are closely interrelated with the university.

University of Toronto

The University of Toronto is a collegiate university consisting of a federation of 11 colleges, with various degrees of independence and autonomy, organized under a central Governing Council.

University of Waterloo
The University of Waterloo has four affiliated institutions, collectively referred to as the "university colleges" or "church colleges": Conrad Grebel University College, a college owned by the Mennonite Church Eastern Canada that offers programs in peace and conflict studies, music, and Mennonite studies; Renison University College, a public college affiliated with the Anglican Church of Canada that offers programs in social development studies, social work, East Asian studies, and languages; St. Jerome's University, a public Roman Catholic liberal arts university established in 1865; and St. Paul's University College, a public college formerly affiliated with the United Church of Canada that offers programs on social justice and environmental issues.

All students can take courses offered by the university and any of the colleges, degrees bear the university's name and seal, and admission to college residences is not restricted based on religious beliefs.

University of Windsor
The University of Windsor has three affiliated institutions: Assumption University, a Roman Catholic university offering graduate degree programs in religious subjects; Canterbury College, a public liberal arts college affiliated with the Anglican Church of Canada; and Iona College, a public liberal arts college formerly affiliated with the United Church of Canada.

University of Western Ontario
The University of Western Ontario has three affiliate colleges: Huron University College, a public liberal arts college established in 1863 and affiliated with the Anglican Church of Canada ; Brescia University College, a public Roman Catholic women's college established in 1919 by the Ursulines; and King's University College, a public Roman Catholic co-educational college established in 1954 that offers programs in liberal arts, business, social justice, and theology (through an affiliation with St. Peter's Seminary).

UWO previously had affiliation agreements with other institutions, including Alma College, Assumption University and Wilfrid Laurier University.

India 
Several thousand schools affiliated with larger universities educate a large number of undergraduates in India.

Pakistan 
Similar arrangements exist between universities and affiliated colleges in Pakistan.

United Kingdom

In England and Wales, the term federated school is used to refer to schools that are part of a school federation, which are groups of schools that share one governing body or collaborate through a shared committee.

Historically, affiliated colleges have existed at some universities in the UK. These include:

University of Cambridge

The University of Cambridge affiliated university colleges in the UK from the late 19th century. Students who had completed two years at these institutions were permitted to reduce the time spent getting an undergraduate degree at Cambridge by a year. The affiliated colleges in 1914 were:

 St David's College, Lampeter
 University College of Wales, Aberystwyth
 University College, Nottingham
 St Edmund's College, Old Hall, Ware
 Hartley University College, Southampton
 University College of South Wales and Monmouthshire, Cardiff
 Royal Albert Memorial University College, Exeter

Durham University

Durham University has had various forms of affiliated college from the late 19th century, including "affiliated colleges" where students could study for Durham degrees (for which provision still exists in the statutes as of 2020, although without any institutions having this status) and "associated theological colleges" where students could study for the Durham License in Theology and could count the three years spent on that course against two years on the BA course at Durham. The affiliated colleges were:

 Sunderland Technical College (1930–1963)
 Codrington College, Barbados (1875–1965)
 Fourah Bay College, Sierra Leone (1876–1967)

The category of associated theological colleges existed from the 1870s until 1949. It included at various times:

 St Aidan's College, Birkenhead (1876)
 St Andrew's College, Oyo, Nigeria (1924) 
 St Augustine's College, Canterbury (1877)
 The Bible Churchmen's Missionary College, Clifton
 Burgh Missionary College (closed 1936)
 Chichester Theological College (1878)
 Cumbrae Theological College (1877)
 Dorchester Missionary College 
 Edinburgh Theological College (1878)
 Gloucester Theological College
 Highbury College, London
 Church Missionary Society College, Islington
 Jamaica Theological College (1910)
 St John's (Armidale, NSW) (1912)
 Lichfield Theological College (1876)
 Lincoln Theological College
 Moore Theological College (Sydney) (1910)
 Queen's College (St John's, Newfoundland) (1912)
 Salisbury Theological College
 Selwyn College (Dunedin) (1910)
 Truro Theological College
 St Boniface Missionary College, Warminster
 Bishop Wilson Theological College, Isle of Man
 The Theological Department of King's College London (1877)
 The Theological Department of Queen's College, Birmingham (1876)

University of London

As first created in 1836, the University of London was an examining board for its affiliated colleges (initially only University College London and King's College London, often referred to as the 'founding colleges'), including a number of Catholic institutions and dissenting academies whose students could not take degrees at Oxford, Cambridge or Durham. This system continued until 1858, when University of London examinations were thrown open to all students with the establishment of the external degree system. The University of London later became a federal university in 1900. By 1858, the following institutions (as they are given in the 1858 charter) had been recognised as affiliated colleges:

 University College London
 King's College London
 Queen's College Belfast
 Queen's College Galway
 Queen's College Cork
 St Cuthbert's College, Ushaw
 Stonyhurst College
 Manchester New College
 St Mary's College, Oscott
 St Patrick's College, Carlow
 St Edmund's College, near Ware
 Spring Hill College, Moseley, near Birmingham
 The College, Regents Park (late Stepney College)
 College of St Gregory the Great, Downside, near Bath
 Countess of Huntingdon's College at Cheshunt
 The Baptist College at Bristol
 Airedale College, Undercliffe, near Bradford
 Protestant Dissenters' College at Rotherham
 Presbyterian College at Carmarthen
 St Kyran's College, Kilkenny
 Huddersfield College
 Lancashire Independent College
 Wesley College near Sheffield
 Queen's College, Birmingham
 Wesleyan Collegiate Institution, Taunton
 Western College, Plymouth
 West of England Dissenters' Proprietary School, Taunton
 St Patrick's College, Thurles
 New College, London
 Owen's College, Manchester
 Bedford Grammar Schools
 Brecon Independent College
 Horton College, Bradford, Yorkshire
 Hackney Theological Seminary
 Trevecca College, Brecon
 Springfield College, Ennis
 Bishop Stortford Collegiate School
 Working Men's College, London
 Queen's College, Liverpool

University of Oxford

The University of Oxford affiliated university colleges in the UK from the late 19th century. Students who had completed two years at these institutions were permitted to reduce the time spent getting an undergraduate degree at Oxford by a year. The affiliated colleges in 1906 were:

 St David's College, Lampeter
 University College, Nottingham
 Firth College, Sheffield
 Reading College, Reading
 Hartley University College, Southampton

United States

Columbia University 
In the United States, Columbia University is associated in various ways with several affiliated schools. Most notably, Barnard College is legally and financially separate from Columbia but its students have access to the instruction and facilities of Columbia.  A similar arrangement exists with Teachers College, which since its affiliation with Columbia has served as the University's Faculty and Department of Education.  Columbia has more limited cooperative arrangements and joint programs and degrees with two nearby independent institutions: Union Theological Seminary and Jewish Theological Seminary.

Harvard University 
Radcliffe College's relationship to Harvard University resembled that of Barnard to Columbia until Radcliffe was completely merged into Harvard in 1999.

Yale University 
The Yale Divinity School, part of Yale University, is associated with two affiliated schools, Berkeley Divinity School and the Andover-Newton Seminary.  Both Berkeley (from 1854 until 1971) and Andover-Newton (from 1807 to 2017) were once entirely independent seminaries and they still maintain their own Boards of Trustees and distinctive missions.  Berkeley also still awards its own diplomas and certificates in Anglican ministry.  But the students of both affiliated schools are also enrolled at, and receive degrees from, the Yale Divinity School and both their students and their faculty are fully integrated into the life of the larger institution.

University of California 
The University of California, Hastings College of the Law is affiliated, as its name suggests, with the University of California, but it is not directly governed by the Regents of the University of California.

Notes

School types